The Atlanta & Edgewood Street Railroad Company of Atlanta, Georgia was organized in 1886 by Joel Hurt, C. W. Hubner, H. E. W. Palmer, W. P. Inman, Peter Lynch, R. C. Mitchell, Asa Griggs Candler, J. P. McDonald, J. G. Reynolds, A. F. Moreland, and P. H. Harralson. It was originally authorized to run horsecars along Foster Street (which would soon be renamed Edgewood Avenue) to what was then the separate village of Edgewood. 

Soon thereafter the Atlanta & Edgewood introduced Atlanta's first electric streetcar service in 1889. Hurt owned the East Atlanta Land Company which improved Edgewood Avenue (demolishing 94 existing dwellings to do so). The cars featured oak interiors and plate glass windows valued at $4,000. The steel rails were gauges heavier than those used on the Georgia Railroad which ran parallel just to the south. The rails were elevated on stone piers and surrounded by paving made of Belgian block. The streetcar was designed to make easily and comfortably accessible Hurt's garden suburb, Inman Park.

See also
Streetcars in Atlanta
Timeline of mass transit in Atlanta

References

 
 
 

History of Atlanta
Defunct public transport operators in the United States
Companies based in Atlanta
Railway lines in Atlanta
Railway companies established in 1886
American companies established in 1886